Milingimbi Airport  is an airport located  east northeast of Milingimbi on Milingimbi Island in the Northern Territory of Australia. The airport received funding for security upgrades in 2006.

History
The airfield was constructed by Milingimbi Mission's Aboriginal residents on behalf of the Royal Australian Air Force during World War II.

Units based at Milingimbi Airfield during World War II
No. 83 Squadron RAAF
No. 457 Squadron RAAF

Airlines and destinations

See also
 List of airports in the Northern Territory

References

Airports in the Northern Territory
World War II airfields in Australia